Oliver Wolcott Sr. (November 20, 1726  December 1, 1797) was an American Founding Father and politician. He was a signer of the United States Declaration of Independence and the Articles of Confederation as a representative of Connecticut, and the nineteenth governor of Connecticut. Wolcott was a major general for the Connecticut militia in the Revolutionary War serving under George Washington.

Early life

Wolcott was born in Windsor, Connecticut, the youngest of 10 children born to colonial Governor Roger Wolcott and Sarah Drake Wolcott. His elder brother was Erastus Wolcott. He attended Yale College, graduating in 1747 as the top scholar in his class. Upon graduation, New York Governor George Clinton granted Wolcott a captain's commission to raise a militia company to fight in the French and Indian Wars (King George's War (1744–1748)). Captain Wolcott served on the northern frontier defending the Canadian border against the French until the Treaty of Aix-la-Chapelle of 1748. He then moved to newly settled Goshen in northwestern Connecticut to practice and study medicine with his brother Alexander. He then moved to Litchfield and became a merchant; he was appointed sheriff of the newly created Litchfield County, Connecticut, serving from 1751 to 1771. He married Lorraine (Laura) Collins of Guilford, Connecticut, on January 21, 1755. They had five children: Oliver (who died young), Oliver Jr., Laura, Mariann, and Frederick.

Career

American Revolutionary War
Wolcott had two careers during the war years as one of Connecticut's principal delegates to the Continental Congress and also a militia officer. He participated in the American Revolutionary War as brigadier general and then as major general in the Connecticut militia. As a representative in the Continental Congress, he was a strong advocate for independence.

Early in the growing struggle with Great Britain, Wolcott made it clear that the colonists would not give up their rights and privileges. In February 1776, he stated: "Our difference with Great Britain has become very great. What matters will issue in, I cannot say, but perhaps in a total disseverance from Great Britain." The early support for independence led him to important roles during the war, both as military leader and as member of the Continental Congress.

Wolcott saw extensive militia service during the American Revolution. On August 11, 1776, Connecticut officials ordered him to march the Seventeenth Regiment of militia to New York and join George Washington's army. Upon arriving at Washington's camp, Connecticut Governor Jonathan Trumbull appointed Wolcott brigadier general in command of all the state's militia regiments in New York. He led 300 to 400 volunteers from his brigade to help General Horatio Gates and Benedict Arnold defeat General John Burgoyne at the Battles of Saratoga.

In May 1779, Wolcott was promoted to major general in command of all Connecticut militia. That summer, he saw combat in protecting the coastline from Tryon's raid.  He was largely unsuccessful in his combat with Major General William Tryon. Over the course of the war, he showed great disdain towards his opposition, describing the British in his memoirs as "a foe who have not only insulted every principle which governs civilized nations but by their barbarities offered the grossest indignities to human nature."

Continental Congress 
At the beginning of the Revolution, Congress had made Wolcott a commissioner of Indian affairs to persuade the northern Indian nations to remain neutral. His qualifications for that role came from his early experience on the northern front of the French and Indian War. He was asked, along with Richard Butler and Arthur Lee, to negotiate a peace treaty with the Six Nations at Fort Schuyler.

He was elected to the Continental Congress in 1775. He became seriously ill in 1776 and did not sign the Declaration of Independence until some time later.

Beyond his postwar diplomatic role, Wolcott aspired to higher office. He was elected Lieutenant Governor of Connecticut as a Federalist in 1786 and served in that position for ten years, holding the office until his death at age 71.

Death and legacy

Wolcott died on December 1, 1797, in Litchfield, where he is interred at East Cemetery. Historian Ellsworth Grant remembers Wolcott's Revolutionary War efforts in stating that, "It is doubtful if any other official in Connecticut during this period carried so many public duties on his shoulders."

Oliver Wolcott Jr., his son, served as Secretary of the Treasury under Presidents George Washington and John Adams and as governor of Connecticut. His descendants include Congregationalist minister Samuel Wolcott, D.D.; Edward O. Wolcott, a United States Senator from Denver; Anna Wolcott Vaile, who established the Wolcott School for Girls in Denver; ethnologist George Gibbs; chemist Oliver Wolcott Gibbs; Brigadier General Alfred Gibbs; and mountaineer Roger Wolcott Toll.

The town of Wolcott, Connecticut, bears his name. In Torrington, Connecticut, there is a school named after him, The Oliver Wolcott Technical High School. His home in Litchfield was declared a National Historic Landmark in 1971. In 1798, Fort Washington on Goat Island in Newport, Rhode Island was renamed Fort Wolcott and was an active fortification until 1836; it later became the site of the United States Naval Torpedo Station.

See also
 Oliver Wolcott House, Litchfield, Connecticut, Built 1753
 Memorial to the 56 Signers of the Declaration of Independence

References

Bibliography
"A Guide to the Oliver Wolcott, Sr. Papers, from 1638-1834." Connecticut Historical Society, 2016.

External links

 American National Biography Online, Oliver Wolcott.
 Biography by Rev. Charles A. Goodrich, 1856
 Litchfield Historical Society
 National Governors Association
 The Political Graveyard
 The Peter Force Library at the Library of Congress has an important compilations of pamphlets that were assembled by Oliver Wolcott.

1726 births
1797 deaths
Connecticut militiamen in the American Revolution
Militia generals in the American Revolution
Continental Congressmen from Connecticut
18th-century American politicians
Signers of the Articles of Confederation
Governors of Connecticut
Connecticut Federalists
Connecticut sheriffs
Signers of the United States Declaration of Independence
American slave owners
American Congregationalists
Yale College alumni
People from Windsor, Connecticut
People from South Windsor, Connecticut
Burials in Connecticut
Lieutenant Governors of Connecticut
Federalist Party state governors of the United States
Military personnel from Connecticut
Members of the American Antiquarian Society
Founding Fathers of the United States